Kegeyli is a town and seat of Kegeyli District in Karakalpakstan in Uzbekistan. The town population was 10,867 people in 1989, and 12,400 in 2016.

References

Populated places in Karakalpakstan
Urban-type settlements in Uzbekistan